Candide ou l'Optimisme du XXe siècle is a 1960 French comedy drama film directed by Norbert Carbonnaux and written by Carbonnaux and Albert Simonin. It stars Jean-Pierre Cassel as Candide, Pierre Brasseur as Pangloss, Louis de Funès as the officer of the Gestapo, and Daliah Lavi as Cunégonde. The film was released under the titles Candide (alternative French title; USA), Candide oder der Optimismus im 20. Jahrhundert (West Germany), Candide, avagy a XX. század optimizmusa (Hungary), and Kandyd czyli optymizm XX wieku (Poland).

Plot 
The film is a 20th-century adaptation of Voltaire's 1759 social satire novel Candide, ou l'Optimisme. Set in the World War II-era, it follows the adventures of Candide, an orphaned Westphalian brought up in a baron's chalet. He falls in love with the baron's daughter, Cunégonde, and is thrown out of the house when the baron discovers them kissing. When war breaks out in 1939, Candide is drafted and then captured by the Nazis, but escapes and joins the International Red Cross. Candide's improbable adventures take him into a concentration camp to rescue his tutor, Pangloss; then he is off to South America (where he endures a series of revolutions), Borneo (where he is imprisoned by a primitive tribe), Moscow (where he accidentally foments a missile crisis between the Soviet Union and the United States), and New York (where he gets mixed up in a racial clash). Finally, back in France, he retires to a country house with Cunégonde, Pangloss, and a mysterious lady who saved him from a firing squad, and settles down to write his memoirs.

Other film treatments
In 1947 Marcel Carné intended to create a film based on Voltaire's 1759 satire Candide, but production was abandoned. The 1986 film Live from Lincoln Center: Candide was also based on the same novel.

Cast 
 Jean-Pierre Cassel : Candide
 Louis de Funès : the officer of the Gestapo
 Pierre Brasseur : Pangloss
 Daliah Lavi : Cunégonde, the daughter of baron
 Nadia Gray : the live-in companion of Cunégonde
 Michel Simon : the colonel Nanar
 Jean Richard : the trafficker of the black market
 Darío Moreno : Don Fernando, the first dictator
 Luis Mariano : the second dictator South American
 Jean Tissier : the doctor Jacques
 Jacqueline Maillan : the puritanical mother
 Jean Poiret : a policeman
 Michel Serrault : a policeman
 Albert Simonin : the major Simpson
 Mathilde Casadesus : the baroness of Thunder-Ten-Trouck
 Robert Manuel : all German officers
 Jean Constantin : the king Fourak
 Don Ziegler : the papa gangster
 O'dett : the baron Thunder-Ten-Trouck
 Michel Garland : the brother of Cunégonde
 Jacques Balutin : the prescription of the colonel
 Gib Grossac : the leader of the Eunuches
 Michèle Verez : Paquerette, the maid of the baroness
 Sybil Saulnier : a lady from the harem
 Habib Benglia : the manhandled Black
 Mireille Alcon : a lady from the harem
 Danielle Tissier : a lady from the harem
 François Chalais : the commentator of the film
 Harold Kay : an American officer
 John William : the leader of "Oreillons"
 Pierre Repp : the priest
 Alice Sapritch : the sister of the baron
 Maurice Biraud : the Dutchman from Bornéo
 Michel Thomass : a Soviet driver

References

External links 
 
 Bosley Crowther, Candide, ou l'optimisme au XX siecle (1960) New York Times movie review
 Candide ou l’optimisme au XXe siècle (1960) at the Films de France

1960 comedy-drama films
1960 films
French comedy-drama films
French black-and-white films
Films directed by Norbert Carbonnaux
Films based on French novels
Adaptations of works by Voltaire
Candide
Films with screenplays by Albert Simonin
French World War II films
1960s French-language films
1960s French films